Queen's Hospital is a health facility on Belvedere Road in Burton upon Trent, Staffordshire. It is managed by University Hospitals of Derby and Burton NHS Foundation Trust.

History
The facility has its origins in the Belvedere Union Workhouse which was designed by J. H. Morton and completed in 1884. An infirmary was subsequently built on the west of the site. It became the Burton Public Assistance Institution in 1930 and then joined the National Health Service as Burton District Hospital in 1948. A redevelopment programme intended to consolidate all the town's medical facilities, including those previously delivered at the old Burton Infirmary in Duke Street, on the Belvedere Road site began in the 1970s. The first phase was completed in 1972 and the second phase was completed in 1993. The new facilities were opened by the Queen in December 1995 and, in recognition of this, the facility was renamed Queen's Hospital in 1996.

References 

Hospitals in Staffordshire
Hospitals established in 1884
1884 establishments in England
Hospital buildings completed in 1884
NHS hospitals in England